The Veil of the Temple is a piece of choral music by British composer Sir John Tavener. Identified by Tavener as "the supreme achievement of my life", it is set for four choirs, several orchestras and soloists and lasts at least seven hours. It is based on text from a number of religions, and received its world premiere performance at the Temple Church, London in June 2003.

Structure
The piece is split into eight cycles. The first seven follow the same structure, with each cycle being a higher key than the previous. For example, Cycles I to VII open with a soprano solo. This is then followed by a setting of the kyrie in either English or the original Greek. Successive cycles add additional musical complexity and words to each movement, with the result that cycle I takes about 20 minutes to perform, but cycle VII takes 1.5 hours.

Cycles I to VII use the following structure:

External links
 Article by composer on johntavener.com
 Discussion of this piece and Tavener by Stephen Layton
 Notes for CD of abridged concert version

References

Compositions by John Tavener
2003 compositions